Dicrossus is a genus of small cichlid fishes native to rivers in the Amazon and Orinoco basins in South America. These cichlids have several dark spots on the sides of their bodies (although very faint in some). Depending on the species, they typically only reach  in length.

In the past, Dicrossus species were sometimes included in the genus Crenicara, instead. Members of both genera are sometimes known as checkerboard or chessboard cichlids.

Species
The five recognized species in this genus are:
 Dicrossus filamentosus (Ladiges, 1958) (chessboard cichlid)
 Dicrossus foirni U. Römer, I. J. Hahn & Vergara, 2010
 Dicrossus gladicauda I. Schindler & Staeck, 2008
 Dicrossus maculatus Steindachner, 1875
 Dicrossus warzeli U. Römer, I. J. Hahn & Vergara, 2010

References

Geophagini
Cichlid genera
Taxa named by Franz Steindachner